Endang Egga Subrata (born 15 June 1992) is an Indonesian professional footballer who plays as a goalkeeper for Liga 2 club Kalteng Putra.

Club career

Persiwa Wamena
In 2018, Endang Subrata signed a one-year contract with Indonesian Liga 2 club Persiwa Wamena.

PSIS Semarang
In 2019, Endang Subrata signed a one-year contract with Indonesian Liga 1 club PSIS Semarang. He made his debut on 4 December 2019 in a match against Persipura Jayapura at the Mandala Stadium, Jayapura.

Mitra Kukar
He was signed for Mitra Kukar to play in Liga 2 in the 2020 season. This season was suspended on 27 March 2020 due to the COVID-19 pandemic. The season was abandoned and was declared void on 20 January 2021.

References

External links
 Endang Subrata at Soccerway
 Endang Subrata at Liga Indonesia

1991 births
Living people
Indonesian footballers
PSIS Semarang players
Association football goalkeepers
Sportspeople from Bandung